Usman Khan may refer to:

 Usman Khan (terrorist) (19912019), British terrorist and perpetrator of the 2019 London Bridge stabbing
 Usman Khan Tarrakai (born 1947), Pakistani politician
 Usman Khan Shinwari (born 1994), Pakistani cricketer
 Usman Khan (cricketer, born 1995) (born 1995), Pakistani cricketer
 Khwaja Usman (died 1612), Pashtun chieftain